The Wall is the Chilean adaptation of the NBC American namesake contest. The program was premiered on June 20, 2018. It is hosted by the Chilean presenter Rafael Araneda.

References

2010s Chilean television series
2018 Chilean television series debuts
2018 Chilean television series endings
Chilean television series based on American television series
Chilevisión original programming
Spanish-language television shows